Telita Crosland is a United States Army lieutenant general who has served as director of the Defense Health Agency since January 3, 2023. She previously served as deputy surgeon general of the United States Army.

Crosland was born in Brooklyn, New York. In 1989, she graduated from the United States Military Academy.

In May 2022, Crosland was nominated for promotion to lieutenant general and assignment as director of the Defense Health Agency. Her nomination was confirmed by the Senate on September 29, 2022.

References

External links

Living people
United States Army generals
Year of birth missing (living people)
Female generals of the United States Army
Recipients of the Legion of Merit
Recipients of the Distinguished Service Medal (US Army)